Federico Marín (born 24 March 1998) is an Argentine professional footballer who plays as a midfielder for Atlanta, on loan from Huracán.

Career
Marín was moved into the first-team squad of Argentine Primera División side Huracán for the 2018–19 season, with manager Gustavo Alfaro selecting him for his professional debut on 30 September 2018 during a win away to Belgrano; he had previously been an unused substitute on four occasions in league and cup.

In December 2019 it was reported, that Marín and his teammate, Walter Pérez, alongside eight other young people had been accused of raping an 18-year-old girl jointly.

Career statistics
.

References

External links

1998 births
Living people
People from Hurlingham Partido
Argentine footballers
Association football midfielders
Argentine Primera División players
Primera Nacional players
Club Atlético Huracán footballers
Defensores de Belgrano footballers
Sacachispas Fútbol Club players
Club Atlético Atlanta footballers
Sportspeople from Buenos Aires Province